Juan Marcelo Cirelli (born April 2, 1984) is an Argentinean professional football coach and former football player, who currently manages PSBS Biak in Indonesian Liga 2.

References

External links
Profile at liga-indonesia.co.id

Living people
1984 births
Argentine footballers
Argentine expatriate footballers
Association football defenders
Expatriate footballers in Indonesia
Liga 1 (Indonesia) players
Expatriate footballers in Malaysia
Persis Solo players
Persebaya Surabaya players
Persidafon Dafonsoro players
Persibo Bojonegoro players
Kuala Lumpur City F.C. players
Zeyashwemye F.C. players
Johor Darul Ta'zim F.C. players
Ferro Carril Oeste footballers
Footballers from Buenos Aires